Kent Olsson (born 1958) is a Swedish orienteering competitor, winner of the 1987 Individual World Orienteering Championships, and also obtained silver medals in 1989 and 1991, as well as silver medal on the Short distance in 1991. Participated on the Swedish team that obtained bronze medals in 1983 and 1987, and silver medal in 1989 (World Championships, Relay).

Olsson was elected "Årets orienterare" by Swedish sports journalists in 1982, 1986 and 1987.

References

1958 births
Living people
Swedish orienteers
Male orienteers
Foot orienteers
World Orienteering Championships medalists